Rúben Filipe Oliveira Saldanha (born 26 January 1988) is a Portuguese professional footballer who plays for S.C. Espinho as an attacking midfielder.

Club career
Born in Arcozelo (Vila Nova de Gaia), Porto District, Saldanha represented three clubs as a youth, including FC Porto from ages 10 to 14. He played amateur football in his first two years as a senior, moving to the Segunda Liga with Varzim S.C. in 2009 and remaining two full seasons there.

After two years in Switzerland, with lower league sides FC Rapperswil-Jona and FC Schaffhausen, Saldanha returned to Leixões and the Portuguese second division after signing a one-year contract. His first three competitive matches were in the Taça da Liga, and he managed to score two goals including a last-minute effort against Atlético Clube de Portugal that allowed his team to advance to the next round after the 3–2 home win.

Saldanha remained in the second tier the following years, representing C.D. Tondela, C.D. Santa Clara and Académica de Coimbra.

References

External links

1988 births
Living people
Sportspeople from Vila Nova de Gaia
Portuguese footballers
Association football midfielders
Liga Portugal 2 players
Segunda Divisão players
Leixões S.C. players
Padroense F.C. players
Varzim S.C. players
C.D. Tondela players
C.D. Santa Clara players
Associação Académica de Coimbra – O.A.F. players
GS Loures players
S.C.U. Torreense players
S.C. Espinho players
FC Rapperswil-Jona players
FC Schaffhausen players
Portugal youth international footballers
Portuguese expatriate footballers
Expatriate footballers in Switzerland
Portuguese expatriate sportspeople in Switzerland